The grey-throated barbet (Gymnobucco bonapartei) is a species of bird in the Lybiidae family (African barbets).
It is found in Angola, Cameroon, Central African Republic, Republic of the Congo, Democratic Republic of the Congo, Equatorial Guinea, Gabon, Kenya, Rwanda, South Sudan, Tanzania, and Uganda.

References

grey-throated barbet
Birds of Central Africa
grey-throated barbet
Taxonomy articles created by Polbot